Switzerland competed at the 1994 Winter Paralympics in Lillehammer, Norway. 19 competitors from Switzerland won 16 medals including 2 gold, 9 silver and 5 bronze and finished 11th in the medal table.

See also 
 Switzerland at the Paralympics
 Switzerland at the 1994 Winter Olympics

References 

1994
1994 in Swiss sport
Nations at the 1994 Winter Paralympics